William Strumberg Stokley was an American politician from Pennsylvania. He served as the 72nd Mayor of Philadelphia from 1872 to 1881.

Biography
Stokley was born on April 25, 1823, in Philadelphia. His father died when he was young, leaving him and his mother to care for his younger brother and sister.

Career
Stokley built a confectionery business and later entered the Franklin Hose Company, a volunteer fire company. As the treasurer and representative to the city's Fire Association, he became exposed to the politics of Philadelphia. In 1860, he won a seat on the Common Council, the lower house of the city council, representing the Ninth Ward. He became the president of the Common Council in 1865.

In 1867, he won a seat on the Select Council and became its president in 1868. On the council, he sought to make reforms of the volunteer fire companies and the Gas Trust. Volunteer fire companies often were a source of violence in the city. Stokley introduced legislation that would eventually lead to a professional fire department in the city. He later worked to shift control of the Philadelphia Gas Works to a city department from the local “gas trust”.

As the president of the Select Council, he became involved in the construction of a new city hall. At the time, there was a considerable dispute as to whether the new building should be constructed at Penn Square, which was in Stokley’s ward or in Washington Square near Independence Hall, which was closer to the commercial center of Philadelphia. In addition, the construction of the building would generate significant government expenditures, which many local businessmen sought to share in. Through his control of the Public Buildings Commission, and the help of Wilson Henszey, an ally in the Pennsylvania State Senate, Stokley won approval for his proposed site. In 1871, he ran for Mayor and defeated James S. Biddle.

The contracts for the construction of City Hall was over $24 million, more than double the original $10 million estimate. On one of the latest contracts, $5.3 million was handed out with no bidding for the marble used in construction. The construction company would purchase the marble from a quarry owned by allies of Stokley. The mayor reportedly acquired a new brownstone home, courtesy of the building contractors.

Stokley went on to win two more terms, beating Alexander K. McClure in 1874 and Joseph L. Caven in 1877. In 1881, some Republicans, including Rudolph Blankenburg, who wanted to see a change from what they viewed as a corrupt administration, pushed the city's Committee of One Hundred to withdraw its endorsement of Stokley in favor of Democrat Samuel G. King. King defeated Stokley in that election.

Stokley died on February 21, 1902, and was interred at Laurel Hill Cemetery in Philadelphia.

See also
List of mayors of Philadelphia

References

External links
Philadelphia Mayors

1823 births
1902 deaths
19th-century American politicians
Burials at Laurel Hill Cemetery (Philadelphia)
Mayors of Philadelphia
Pennsylvania Republicans